The work of Catholic nun and missionary Anjezë Gonxhe Bojaxhiu, commonly known as Mother Teresa and from 2016 as Saint Teresa of Calcutta, received mixed reactions from prominent people, governments, and organisations. Her practices, and those of the Missionaries of Charity, the order which she founded, were subject to numerous controversies. These include objections to the quality of medical care which they provided, suggestions that some deathbed baptisms constituted forced conversion, and alleged links to colonialism and racism and to relations to questionable public figures. The controversy extends to include the large sums of money donated to her as well as the Vatican for ignoring the criticisms raised.

Media criticisms
Indian author and physician Aroup Chatterjee, who briefly worked in one of Mother Teresa's homes, investigated the financial practices and other practices of Teresa's order. In 1994, two British journalists, Christopher Hitchens and Tariq Ali, produced a critical British Channel 4 documentary, Hell's Angel, based on Chatterjee's work. The next year, Hitchens published The Missionary Position: Mother Teresa in Theory and Practice, a book that repeated many of the accusations in the documentary. Chatterjee published The Final Verdict in 2003, a less polemical work than those of Hitchens and Ali, but equally critical of Teresa's operations. In 2003, after Teresa was beatified by John Paul II, Hitchens continued his criticism, calling her "a fanatic, a fundamentalist, and a fraud." He further criticised the Catholic Church for attributing the recovery of a patient to a miracle, and for ignoring the testimony of the patient's doctor, who attributed the recovery of his patient to modern medicine. Chatterjee and Hitchens were called by the Vatican to present evidence against Teresa during her canonisation process.

Quality of medical care 
In 1994, Robin Fox, then editor of the British medical journal The Lancet, visited the Home for Dying Destitutes in Calcutta (now Kolkata) and described the medical care the patients received as "haphazard". He observed that sisters and volunteers, some of whom had no medical knowledge, frequently made decisions about patient care because of the lack of doctors in the hospice: "There are doctors that call in from time to time," Fox wrote, "but usually the sisters and volunteers (some of whom have medical knowledge) make decisions as best they can." Fox witnessed one patient with high fever being treated with paracetamol and tetracycline, an antibiotic, only to be later diagnosed with malaria by a visiting doctor, who prescribed chloroquine. Fox specifically held Teresa responsible for these conditions in the Home, writing, Mother Teresa "prefers providence to planning". Fox also observed that staff either declined to use or lacked access to blood films or "simple algorithms that might help the sisters distinguish" between curable and incurable patients: "Investigations, I was told, are seldom permissible".

Fox conceded that the regimen he observed included "cleanliness, the tending of wounds and sores, and loving kindness", but critiqued the sisters' "spiritual approach" to managing pain: "I was disturbed to learn that the formulary includes no strong analgesics. Along with the neglect of diagnosis, the lack of good analgesia marks Mother Theresa's [sic] approach as clearly separate from the hospice movement. I know which I prefer."

Mary Loudon, who volunteered at the same facility, observed "syringes run under cold water and reused, aspirin given to those with terminal cancer, and cold baths given to everyone" as well as overcrowding.

There have been a series of other reports documenting inattention to medical care in the order's facilities. Similar points of view have also been expressed by some former volunteers who worked for Teresa's order. Mother Teresa herself referred to the facilities as "Houses of the Dying".

In 2013, in a comprehensive review covering 96% of the literature on Mother Teresa, a group of Université de Montréal academics reinforced the foregoing criticism, detailing, among other issues, the missionary's practice of "caring for the sick by glorifying their suffering instead of relieving it,[...] her questionable political contacts, her suspicious management of the enormous sums of money she received, and her overly dogmatic views regarding, in particular, abortion, contraception, and divorce". Questioning the Vatican's motivations for ignoring the mass of criticism, the study concluded that Mother Teresa's "hallowed image – which does not stand up to analysis of the facts – was constructed, and that her beatification was orchestrated by an effective media relations campaign" engineered by BBC journalist Malcolm Muggeridge, who shared her anti-abortion views.

Baptisms of the dying 
According to Christopher Hitchens, Mother Teresa encouraged members of her order to secretly baptise dying patients, without regard to the individual's religion. Susan Shields, a former member of the Missionaries of Charity, writes that "Sisters were to ask each person in danger of death if he wanted a 'ticket to heaven'. An affirmative reply was to mean consent to baptism. The sister was then to pretend that she was just cooling the patient's head with a wet cloth, while in fact she was baptising him, saying quietly the necessary words. Secrecy was important so that it would not come to be known that Mother Teresa's sisters were baptising Hindus and Muslims."

Murray Kempton has argued that patients were not provided sufficient information to make an informed decision about whether they wanted to be baptised and the theological significance of a Christian baptism. Simon Leys, defending the practice in a letter to the New York Review of Books, argued: "The material act of baptism consists in shedding a few drops of water on the head of a person, while mumbling a dozen simple ritual words. Either you believe in the supernatural effect of this gesture—and then you should dearly wish for it. Or you do not believe in it, and the gesture is as innocent and well-meaningly innocuous as chasing a fly away with a wave of the hand."

Relationships with controversial public figures 
In Hell's Angel and The Missionary Position, Hitchens leveled criticism at what he perceived to be Mother Teresa's endorsement of Albanian President Enver Hoxha, who in 1967, forcibly closed all religious facilities, including her own faith's Roman Catholic ones and also outlawed private worship. Hoxha also used food- and beverage-based entrapment at schools and workplaces during Lent and Ramadan, by offering foods and non-water drinks that were forbidden during these observances' fasting hours (and offering pork to Jews and Muslims which is forbidden to both at all times under both religions' dietary laws and alcohol to Muslims which, like pork, is always forbidden to them), and people who refused these items were publicly denounced as enemies of the state. This continued until Hoxha's death in 1985, whereas his successor, Ramiz Alia, was more tolerant of private religious observances and who re-legalized public worship in 1990. She visited Albania in August 1989, where she was received by Hoxha's widow, Nexhmije, Foreign Minister Reis Malile, Minister of Health Ahmet Kamberi, the Chairman of the People's Assembly Petro Dode, and other state and party officials, subsequently laying a bouquet on Hoxha's grave, and placed a wreath on the statue of Mother Albania.

She accepted money from the British publisher Robert Maxwell, who, as was later revealed, embezzled UK£450 million from his employees' pension funds. There is no suggestion that she was aware of any theft before accepting the donation in either case. Criticism does focus on Teresa's character statement produced in the Charles Keating case, where Keating was charged with fraud following high-profile business failures. Keating had donated millions of dollars to Mother Teresa and had lent her his private jet when she visited the United States. Keating's convictions were thrown out on appeal, as was a summary judgement. Keating later pled guilty to four counts of wire and bankruptcy fraud and was sentenced to time served.

After Indian Prime Minister Indira Gandhi's suspension of civil liberties in 1975 (The Emergency), Mother Teresa said: "People are happier. There are more jobs. There are no strikes." These approving comments were seen as a result of the friendship between Teresa and the Congress Party. Mother Teresa's comments were criticised by some outside India within the Catholic media.

She supported Licio Gelli's nomination for the Nobel Prize in Literature. Gelli was known for being the head of the Propaganda Due masonic lodge, which was implicated in various murders and high-profile corruption cases in Italy, as well as having close connections with the neo-fascist Italian Social Movement and the Military Junta who ruled during Argentina's last dictatorship (1976-1983).

In 2017, investigative journalist Gianluigi Nuzzi, in a book titled Original Sin, published accounting documents from the Vatican Bank – officially known as the Institute for the Works of Religion – which revealed that the funds which were held in Mother Teresa's name on behalf of her charity had made her the Bank's biggest client, and they amounted to billions. Had she made substantial withdrawals, the Bank would have risked default.

Motivation for charitable activities 
Chatterjee stated that the public image of Mother Teresa as a "helper of the poor" was misleading, and that only a few hundred people are served by even the largest of the homes. In 1998, among the 200 charitable assistance organisations reported to operate in Calcutta, Missionaries of Charity was not ranked among the largest charity organisations – with the Assembly of God charity notably serving a greater number of the poor at 18,000 meals daily.

Chatterjee stated that many operations of the order engage in no charitable activity at all but instead use their funds for missionary work. He stated, for example, that none of the eight facilities that the Missionaries of Charity run in Papua New Guinea have any residents in them, being purely for the purpose of converting local people to Catholicism.

She was sometimes accused by Hindus in her adopted country of trying to convert the poor to Christianity by "stealth". Christopher Hitchens described Mother Teresa's organisation as a cult that promoted suffering and did not help those in need. He said that Mother Teresa's own words on poverty proved that her intention was not to help people, while he quoted her words at a 1981 press conference in which she was asked: "Do you teach the poor to endure their lot?" She replied: "I think it is very beautiful for the poor to accept their lot, to share it with the passion of Christ. I think the world is being much helped by the suffering of the poor people."

Relationship to colonialism and racism 

Australian feminist Germaine Greer called her a "religious imperialist" who preyed on the most vulnerable in the name of harvesting souls for Jesus. Greer also spoke in detail about how whiteness pertained to this, and the colonial, white saviour mindset many Europeans have had towards non-Europeans throughout modern history. This argument was praised, but audiences have pointed out that Teresa herself had a relatively brown complexion and likely a diverse Ottoman heritage like many fellow Albanians; in essence, there was some consensus that it would have been more applicable when referring to figures regarded as white saviours who were privileged Western Europeans and universally regarded as white people themselves, such as Louise Linton, Jim Jones and Stacey Dooley. But nonetheless, there is no evidence to dispel the common criticism that Mother Teresa was prejudiced towards the darker-skinned Indians she served, and sought to "civilise them" with Christianity. In an essay in the collection White Women in Racialized Spaces, historian Vijay Prashad said of Mother Teresa:

Posthumous criticisms 
Mother Teresa died in 1997. Despite her request that all of her writings and correspondences be destroyed, a collection of them was posthumously released to the public in book form. Her writings revealed that she struggled with feelings of disconnectedness, that were in contrast to the strong feelings which she had experienced as a young novice. In her letters Mother Teresa describes a decades-long sense of feeling disconnected from God and lacking the earlier zeal that had characterised her efforts to start the Missionaries of Charity. As a result of this, she was judged by some to have "ceased to believe" and was posthumously criticised for hypocrisy. Thomas C. Reeves suggests that this criticism displays a basic unfamiliarity with the concept of the "dark night of the soul".

"Holier than Thou", the May 23, 2005, episode of the Showtime programme Penn & Teller: Bullshit!, criticised Mother Teresa, as well as Mahatma Gandhi and the 14th Dalai Lama. Specifically, the episode pointed to Mother Teresa's relationships with Charles Keating and the Duvalier family, as well as the quality of medical care in her home for the dying. Christopher Hitchens appears in the episode, offering accounts based on his reporting on her life. According to Navin B. Chawla, the Missionaries of Charity set up a small mission in Port-au-Prince. A day after Mother Teresa visited and left, Michèle Bennett (Haiti's dictator François Duvalier's daughter-in-law) went to Mother Teresa's mission and donated $1,000, not one million as reported.

After the Jesuit priest Donald McGuire was convicted of sexually molesting multiple children, Mother Teresa was criticized for defending him and urging that he be reinstated to the ministry after he was initially removed.

In 2016, when she was canonised, Dan Savage drew attention to the conflicting evidence and accused NPR of describing alleged miracles in a way that favoured the church's interpretation.

In 2021, Michelle Goldberg, an opinion columnist for The New York Times published a column suggesting that some of Mother Teresa's actions were those of a cult leader. She indicates that a former member of the order says some nuns used to self flagellate with a rope or chain.

Responses to criticism 

Navin B. Chawla points out that Mother Teresa never intended to build hospitals, but to provide a place where those who had been refused admittance "could at least die being comforted and with some dignity." He also counters critics of Mother Teresa by stating that her periodic hospitalizations were instigated by staff members against her wishes and he disputes the claim that she conducted surreptitious baptisms. "Those who are quick to criticise Mother Teresa and her mission, are unable or unwilling to do anything to help with their own hands."

Sister Mary Prema Pierick, the former Superior General of the Missionaries of Charity, also stated that Mother Teresa's homes were never intended to be a substitute for hospitals, but rather "homes for those not accepted in the hospital... But if they need hospital care, then we have to take them to the hospital, and we do that." Sister Pierick also contested the claims that Mother Teresa deliberately cultivated suffering, and affirmed her order's goal was to alleviate suffering.

Melanie McDonagh has noted that Mother Teresa is in large part "criticized for not being what she never set out to be, for not doing things which she never saw as her job.[...] What she wasn't was a head of government. She didn't address the fundamental causes of poverty because she was addressing the symptoms and she did that well," nor were her sisters social workers. McDonagh commented, "She wasn't trying to do anything except treat people at the margins of society as if they were Christ himself."

Mari Marcel Thekaekara points out that after the Bangladesh War, a few million refugees poured into Calcutta from the former East Pakistan. "No one had ever before done anything remotely like Mother Teresa's order, namely picking up destitute and dying people off the pavements and giving them a clean place to die in dignity."

Three prominent palliative care professionals, David Jeffrey, Joseph O'Neill and Gilly Burn, responded to Fox in the Lancet and argued that it was disingenuous to single out Mother Teresa's hospices for healthcare limitations that were common to most care facilities in India. They noted Indian healthcare generally suffered from: "1) lack of education of doctors and nurses, 2) few drugs, and 3) very strict state government legislation, which prohibits the use of strong analgesics even to patients dying of cancer". They concluded Mother Teresa's homes were being unfairly held to the standards of "Western-style hospice care[...] not relevant to India".

According to Mark Woods, writing in Christian Today, "perhaps just as significant, in terms of her public perception, is the sense among Christians that her critics don't really understand what she was doing. So to criticise her for opposing abortion and contraception, for instance, is to criticise her for not running a secular charity, which she never pretended to do."

In 2012, William Doino Jr, wrote that "The remarkable thing about Hell's Angel is that it purports to defend the poor against Mother Teresa's supposed exploitation of them, while never actually interviewing any on screen. Not a single person cared for by the Missionaries speaks on camera. Was this because they had a far higher opinion of Blessed Teresa than Hitchens would permit in his film? Avoiding the people at the heart of Teresa's ministry, Hitchens posed for the camera and let roll a series of ad hominem attacks and unsubstantiated accusations, as uninformed as they were cruel."

See also 
Prelest § Prelest#E. Orthodox views on the lives of certain Catholic saints (this is a general Eastern Orthodox critique of unhealthy psychology in some Catholic saints)

References

Further reading 
 Doino, William Jr. "Mother Teresa and Her Critics". First Things 2013.
 Prashad, Vijay. "Mother Teresa: A Communist View". Australian Marxist Review 40 (1998); previously published in Political Affairs.
 Warner, Sally. Mother Teresa: The Genius of Calcutta. New Delhi: Pranoti, 2003. .

External links 
 Akande, Zainab. "Mother Teresa Not a Saint: New Study Suggests She Was a Fraud". Mic.com. 2013.
 Dicker, Ron. "Mother Teresa Humanitarian Image A 'Myth,' New Study Says". Huffington Post. 4 March 2013.
 Hitchens, Christopher. "Mommie Dearest". Slate. October 2013.
 Taylor, Adam. "Why Mother Teresa is still no saint to many of her critics". The Washington Post. September 1, 2016
 Thomas, Prince Mathews. "Pointing Fingers At Mother Teresa's Heirs". Forbes. 10 August 2010.
 Varagur, Krithika "Mother Teresa Was No Saint". Huffington Post. Mar 18, 2016.

Mother Teresa
Catholicism-related controversies
20th-century controversies
Teresa, Mother
Philanthropy of individuals